Per Fosser (born 1945) is a Norwegian orienteering competitor. He is Relay World Champion from 1970, as a member of the Norwegian winning team, which consisted of Ola Skarholt, Stig Berge, Fosser and Åge Hadler. He won a bronze medal in the relay at the 1968 World Championships, again with Skarholt, Berge and Hadler on the team.

Personal life
Fosser is grandfather of Kasper Fosser.

References

External links
 

1945 births
Living people
Norwegian orienteers
Male orienteers
Foot orienteers
World Orienteering Championships medalists
20th-century Norwegian people